Goodnight Scrub is a national park in Queensland, Australia, 274 km northwest of Brisbane. It is located in the locality of Good Night which is split between the Bundaberg Region and the North Burnett Region local government areas, but is predominantly in the Bundaberg Region part of the locality. At the southern extent of the park is the  Paradise Dam.

Goodnight Scrub National Park protects dry rainforest predominated by hoop pine.  At least five rare or threatened species have been identified in the park.

Camping is not permitted in the park.  No walking tracks are provided, however there are fire trails.

The elevation of the terrain is 154 meters.

See also

 Protected areas of Queensland

References

National parks of Queensland
Wide Bay–Burnett